Robert P. Chamberlin (born April 6, 1965) is an associate justice of the Supreme Court of Mississippi.

Biography and legal career

Chamberlin was born April 6, 1965. Chamberlin received his Bachelor of Arts from the University of Mississippi and his Juris Doctor from the University of Mississippi School of Law. He was admitted to the bar in 1990.

From 1991 to 1999, Chamberlin was a municipal judge for Hernando, Mississippi. He was a municipal prosecutor for Horn Lake, Mississippi in 1992.

State senate service
He was elected to the Mississippi Senate in 1999, and served Senate District 1 of DeSoto County for five years.

State court service
Chamberlin served on the 17th Circuit District. He was appointed to this position by Haley Barbour on November 24, 2004.

Service on Supreme Court of Mississippi
Chamberlin won a runoff election on Nov. 29, 2016, when he received around 55% of the vote for District 3, Place 1. The seat was originally held by then-Justice Ann Hannaford Lamar.

Chamberlin's eight-year term began in January 2017. He took the oath of office on Jan. 3 at the Mississippi Supreme Court.

Personal life
He is married to his wife Kim and they have one son, William.

References

External links
Official Biography on Mississippi Supreme Court website

1965 births
Living people
Politicians from Memphis, Tennessee
Justices of the Mississippi Supreme Court
University of Mississippi alumni
University of Mississippi School of Law alumni
Mississippi state senators
Mississippi state court judges
21st-century American judges